The Peabody Museum can refer to:
 George Peabody House Museum, a historic house museum in Peabody, Massachusetts
 Peabody Essex Museum, an art museum in Salem, Massachusetts
 Peabody Historical Library Museum in Peabody, Kansas
 Peabody Leather Museum in Peabody, Massachusetts
 Peabody Museum of Archaeology and Ethnology at Harvard University
 Peabody Museum of Natural History at Yale University
 Peabody Museum of Salem in Salem, Massachusetts, now part of the Peabody Essex Museum
 Robert S. Peabody Museum of Archaeology, former name of the Robert S. Peabody Institute of Archaeology in Andover, Massachusetts